Alfred Lerner may refer to:

 Al Lerner (1933–2002), American businessman
 Alfred D. Lerner (1928–2009), American politician